Dead Creek is a  long 3rd order tributary to Muddy Creek in Crawford County, Pennsylvania.

Course
Dead Creek rises in Eaton Corners, Pennsylvania, and then flows northwest to join Muddy Creek about 1 mile south of Ferris Corners.

Watershed
Dead Creek drains  of area, receives about 44.8 in/year of precipitation, has a wetness index of 503.78, and is about 44% forested.

See also
 List of rivers of Pennsylvania

References

Rivers of Pennsylvania
Rivers of Crawford County, Pennsylvania